Christine Labrie is a Canadian politician. She was elected to the National Assembly of Quebec in the 2018 provincial election and represents the electoral district of Sherbrooke as a member of Québec solidaire.

Electoral Record

References 

Living people
1987 births
Politicians from Sherbrooke
Québec solidaire MNAs
Women MNAs in Quebec
21st-century Canadian politicians
21st-century Canadian women politicians
University of Ottawa alumni
Université de Sherbrooke alumni
Université Laval alumni